The Tufs et calcaires de Rosan is a geologic formation in France. It preserves fossils dating back to the Katian to Hirnantian (Kralodvorian to Kosovian in the regional stratigraphy) stages of the Late Ordovician period.

Fossil content 
The formation has provided fossils of:

Strophomenata 

 Hedstroemina sp.
 Iberomena sp.
 Leptaena sp.
 Leptestiina sp.

Rhynchonellata 

 Porambonites sp.
 Eoanastrophia sp.
 Rostricellula sp.
 ?Dalmanella sp.
 Bancroftina sp.
 Nicolella sp.
 Retrorsirostra sp.
 Ptychopleurella sp.
 Dolerorthis sp.
 Mcewanella sp.
 Aberia sp.
 ?Rhactorthis sp.

See also 
 List of fossiliferous stratigraphic units in France

References

Bibliography 
 M. Melou. 1990. Brachiopodes articules de la coupe de l'ile de Rosan (Crozon, Finistere); formation des tufs et calcaires de Rosan (Caradoc-Ashgill). Géobios 23(5):539-579

Geologic formations of France
Ordovician System of Europe
Ordovician France
Hirnantian
Katian
Tuff formations
Limestone formations
Ordovician south paleopolar deposits
Paleontology in France
Formations